Nikita Valeryevich Kryukov (born 30 May 1985) is a Russian former cross-country skier who competed internationally between 2006 and 2018. He was a sprint specialist who won an Olympic gold medal, three World Championship gold medals, six World cup gold medals (three stage races, three individual World Cups), all in the sprint events. He was arguably the fastest skier ever when it came to double-poling on the flat in sprints. He generally favoured classic skiing and classic sprints over freestyle, but as he showed in winning the team sprint in the 2013 World Championship, in Val di Fiemme, he was also very strong in the freestyle sprint.

Career
The highlights of his career were at the 2010 Vancouver Olympics where he beat his teammate from behind with a late closing sprint, in a photo finish that took minutes to determine. At the 2013 World Championships, where he won gold medals in both the individual classic sprint and the team freestyle sprint. A late fall by another team that impeded his closing 200 metres likely cost him a second Olympic Gold in the team sprint in Sochi where he took silver.

In November 2017, Maxim Vylegzhanin was disqualified for doping offenses, as a result Kryukov lost its silver medal in the Team sprint awarded at the 2014 Winter Olympics. On 22 December 2017 Kriukov as well was found to have committed violations against the anti-doping rule at the 2014 Olympics. He was ordered to return his Olympic silver medal and barred from all future Olympic games. In January 2018, he successfully appealed against the lifetime ban as well as decision to strip his medal from Sochi Olympics at the court of arbitration for sport.

Kryukov announced his retirement from cross-country skiing on April 8, 2019.

Cross-country skiing results
All results are sourced from the International Ski Federation (FIS).

Olympic Games
 2 medals – (1 gold, 1 silver)

World Championships
 5 medals – (3 gold, 1 silver, 1 bronze)

World Cup

Season standings

Individual podiums
5 victories – (1 , 4 ) 
14 podiums – (8 , 6 )

Team podiums

1 victory – (1 ) 
5 podiums – (5 )

References

External links
 
 
 

1985 births
Cross-country skiers at the 2010 Winter Olympics
Living people
Olympic gold medalists for Russia
Olympic cross-country skiers of Russia
Skiers from Moscow
Russian male cross-country skiers
Olympic medalists in cross-country skiing
FIS Nordic World Ski Championships medalists in cross-country skiing
Medalists at the 2010 Winter Olympics
Russian sportspeople in doping cases
Doping cases in cross-country skiing
Olympic silver medalists for Russia